"→unfinished→" is the 18th single released by the Japanese-pop singer Kotoko. The title track, composed by Satoshi Yaginuma of fripSide, was used as the ending theme song for the anime Accel World. It was released under Warner Music Japan.

Track listing

References

2012 singles
2012 songs
Kotoko (singer) songs
Anime songs